Paul V. Dugan (born January 1, 1939) is an American former politician. He was the 40th Lieutenant Governor of Kansas from 1979 to 1983. He attended Regis College, earning a business administration degree, and Washburn University in Topeka for a law degree.

References

1939 births
Living people
Kansas Democrats
Kansas lawyers
Lieutenant Governors of Kansas
Regis College alumni
Washburn University alumni
Writers from Kansas